Wilfred Cantwell Smith  (July 21, 1916 – February 7, 2000) was a Canadian Islamicist, comparative religion scholar, and Presbyterian minister. He was the founder of the Institute of Islamic Studies at McGill University in Quebec and later the director of Harvard University's Center for the Study of World Religions. The Harvard University Gazette said he was one of the field's most influential figures of the past century. In his 1962 work The Meaning and End of Religion he notably questioned the modern sectarian concept of religion.

Early life and career 
Smith was born on 21 July 1916 in Toronto, Ontario, to parents Victor Arnold Smith and Sarah Cory Cantwell. He was the younger brother of Arnold Smith and the father of Brian Cantwell Smith. He primarily received his secondary education at Upper Canada College.

Smith studied at University College, Toronto, receiving a Bachelor of Arts degree with honours in oriental languages circa 1938. After his thesis was rejected by the University of Cambridge, supposedly for its Marxist critique of the British Raj, he and his wife Muriel Mackenzie Struthers spent seven years in pre-independence India (1940–1946), during which he taught Indian and Islamic history at Forman Christian College in Lahore.

In 1948 he obtained a Doctor of Philosophy degree in oriental languages at Princeton University, after which he taught at McGill, founding in 1952 the university's Institute of Islamic Studies. From 1964 to 1973 Smith taught at Harvard Divinity School. He left Harvard for Dalhousie University in Halifax, Nova Scotia, where he founded the Department of Religion. He was also among the original editorial advisors of the scholarly journal Dionysius. In 1978 he returned to Harvard. In 1979 he received an honorary doctorate from Concordia University. After his retirement from Harvard in 1984, he was appointed a senior research associate in the Faculty of Divinity at Trinity College, University of Toronto, in 1985.

Death and legacy 

Smith died on 7 February 2000 in Toronto. His papers are preserved in Special Collections and Archives at the University Library at California State University, Northridge.

Views on religion

In his best known  The Meaning and End of Religion: A New Approach to the Religious Traditions of Mankind (1962), Smith examines the concept of "religion" in the sense of "a systematic religious entity, conceptually identifiable and characterizing a distinct community". He concludes that it is a misleading term for both the practitioners and observers and it should be abandoned in favour of other concepts. The reasons for the objection are that the word 'religion' is "not definable" and its noun form ('religion' as opposed to the adjectival form 'religious') "distorts reality". Moreover, the term is unique to the Western civilization; there are no terms in the languages of other civilizations that correspond to it. Smith also notes that it "begets bigotry" and can "kill piety". He regards the term as having outlived its purpose.

Smith contends that the concept of religion, rather than being a universally valid category as is generally supposed, is a peculiarly European construct of recent origin.  Religion, he argues, is a static concept that does not adequately address the complexity and flux of religious lives. Instead of the concept of religion, Smith proffers a new conceptual apparatus: the dynamic dialectic between cumulative tradition (all historically observable rituals, art, music, theologies, etc.) and personal faith.

Smith sets out chapter by chapter to demonstrate that none of the founders or followers of the world's major religions had any understanding that they were engaging in a defined system called religion. The major exception to this rule, Smith points out, is Islam which he describes as "the most entity-like." In a chapter titled "The Special Case of Islam", Smith points out that the term Islam appears in the Qur'an, making it the only religion not named in opposition to or by another tradition. Other than the prophet Mani, only the prophet Muhammad was conscious of the establishment of a religion. Smith points out that the Arabic language does not have a word for religion, strictly speaking: he details how the word din, customarily translated as such, differs in significant important respects from the European concept.

The terms for major world religions today, including Hinduism, Buddhism, and Shintoism, did not exist until the 19th century.  Smith suggests that practitioners of any given faith do not historically come to regard what they do as religion until they have developed a degree of cultural self-regard, causing them to see their collective spiritual practices and beliefs as in some way significantly different from the other. Religion in the contemporary sense of the word is for Smith the product of both identity politics and apologetics:

One's own "religion" may be piety and faith, obedience, worship, and a vision of God. An alien "religion" is a system of beliefs or rituals, an abstract and impersonal pattern of observables.

A dialectic ensues, however. If one's own "religion" is attacked, by unbelievers who necessarily conceptualize it schematically, or all religion is, by the indifferent, one tends to leap to the defence of what is attacked, so that presently participants of a faith – especially those most involved in argument – are using the term in the same externalist and theoretical sense as their opponents. Religion as a systematic entity, as it emerged in the seventeenth and eighteenth centuries, is a concept of polemics and apologetics.

By way of an etymological study of religion (in Latin), Smith further contends that the term, which at first and for most of the centuries denoted an attitude towards a relationship between God and man, has through conceptual slippage come to mean a "system of observances or beliefs", a historical tradition which has been institutionalized through a process of reification.  Whereas religio denoted personal piety, religion came to refer to an abstract entity (or transcendental signifier) which, Smith says, does not exist.

He argues that the term as found in Lucretius and Cicero was internalized by the Catholic Church through Lactantius and Augustine of Hippo. During the Middle Ages it was superseded by the term faith, which Smith favours by contrast. In the Renaissance,  via the Christian Platonist Marsilio Ficino, religio becomes popular again, retaining its original emphasis on personal practice, even in John Calvin's Christianae Religionis Institutio (1536). During 17th-century debates between Catholics and Protestants, religion begins to refer to an abstract system of beliefs, especially when describing an oppositional structure. Through the Enlightenment this concept is further reified, so that by the nineteenth century G. W. F. Hegel defines religion as Begriff, "a self-subsisting transcendent idea that unfolds itself in dynamic expression in the course of ever-changing history ... something real in itself, a great entity with which man has to reckon, a something that precedes all its historical manifestation".

Smith concludes by arguing that the term religion has now acquired four distinct senses:
 personal piety (e.g. as meant by the phrase "he is more religious than he was ten years ago");
 an overt system of beliefs, practices and values, related  to a particular community manifesting itself as the ideal religion that the theologian tries to formulate, but which he knows transcends him (e.g. 'true Christianity');
 an overt system of beliefs, practices and values, related  to a particular community manifesting itself as the empirical phenomenon, historical and sociological (e.g. the Christianity of history);
 a generic summation or universal category, i.e. religion in general.

The Meaning and End of Religion remains Smith's most influential work. The anthropologist of religion and postcolonial scholar Talal Asad has said that the book is a modern classic and a masterpiece.

Works 
 Modern Islam in India: A Social Analysis (1943, 1946, 1963), Victor Gollancz, London, 
 The Muslim League, 1942–1945 (1945) Minerva Book Shop, 57 p.
 Pakistan as an Islamic State: Preliminary Draft (1954), Shaikh Muhammad Ashraf, 114 p.
 Islam in Modern History: The tension between Faith and History in the Islamic World (1957), Princeton University Press 1977 paperback: 
 The Meaning and End of Religion: A New Approach to the Religious Traditions of Mankind (Macmillan, 1962), Fortress Press 1991 paperback: 
 The Faith of Other Men (1963), Dutton, . from seven CBC Radio talks
 Questions of Religious Truth (1967), Scribner
 Religious Diversity: Essays (1976), HarperCollins paperback: 
 Belief and History (1977), University of Virginia Press 1986 paperback: 
 On Understanding Islam: Selected Studies editor, (1981), The Hague: Mouton Publishers: , Walter De Gruyter Inc. hardcover: , paperback: , 2000 reprint: 
 Scripture: Issues as Seen by a Comparative Religionist (1985) Claremont Graduate School, 22 p., no ISBN
 Towards a World Theology: Faith and the Comparative History of Religion (1989) Macmillan paperback: , Orbis Books 1990 paperback: 
 What Is Scripture? A Comparative Approach, Fortress Press 1993: 
 Patterns of Faith Around the World, Oneworld Publications 1998: 
 Faith and Belief, Princeton University Press 1979: , Oneworld Publications 1998: 
 Believing, Oneworld Publications 1998: 
 Wilfred Cantwell Smith Reader (2001), Kenneth Cracknell editor, Oneworld Publications, 
 "Wilfred Cantwell Smith. A Chronological Bibliography", compiled by Russell T. McCutcheon, in Michel Despland, Gerard Vallée (eds.), Religion in History. The Word, the Idea, the Reality, Waterloo, Ontario, Wilfrid Laurier University Press  1992, pp. 243–252.

See also 
 Religious pluralism
 Universalism

References

Footnotes

Bibliography

Further reading

External links 
 Memorial from Harvard University
 Obituary for W.C. Smith from Age of Significance

1916 births
2000 deaths
Academic staff of McGill University
Religion academics
Harvard University faculty
People from Toronto
Presidents of the American Academy of Religion
Princeton University alumni
Religious studies scholars
University of Toronto alumni
Upper Canada College alumni
Officers of the Order of Canada